Skhtorashen (also Şıxtoraşen, Skhtorasher, and Suktorashen) or Shykh Dursun is a village de facto in the Martuni Province of the breakaway Republic of Artsakh, de jure in the Khojavend District of Azerbaijan, in the disputed region of Nagorno-Karabakh. 

Near the village is a 2042 years old (as of 2022) giant Oriental plane tree (Platanus orientalis) named Tnjri, with a circumference of 27 m and height of 54 m.

History 
During the Soviet period, the village was a part of the Martuni District of the Nagorno-Karabakh Autonomous Oblast.

Historical heritage sites 
Historical heritage sites in and around the village include Tnjri, a 2,000-year-old Oriental Plane, the 12th/13th-century village of Mavas, the village of Hin Skhtorashen from between the 15th and 19th centuries, the 17th-century monastic complex of Yerek Mankuk in Mavas, and the church of Surb Astvatsatsin built in 1731.

Economy and culture 
The population is mainly engaged in agriculture and animal husbandry. The village is part of the community of Karmir Shuka.

Demographics 
The village has an ethnic Armenian-majority population, and had 19 inhabitants in 2005.

Gallery

References

External links 

 

Populated places in Martuni Province
Populated places in Khojavend District